Marc Bourrier (born 21 September 1934) is a French football midfielder who played for Montpellier, Lens, Toulon and Avignon.

He most notably won the 1988 UEFA European Under-21 Football Championship with the France national under-21 football team. He also coached Avignon, Marseille, Sète and Alès.

References

External links
 profile at om1899 website, spotlighting trainers active during 1993–94
 profile at "site rcl"

Sportspeople from Hérault
French footballers
Montpellier HSC players
RC Lens players
SC Toulon players
Ligue 1 players
Ligue 2 players
French football managers
Olympique de Marseille managers
1934 births
Living people
France national under-21 football team managers
Association football midfielders
AC Avignonnais players
AC Avigonnnais managers
Association football coaches
Footballers from Occitania (administrative region)